Taming of the fire is a 1972 film, directed by Daniil Khrabrovitsky and starring Kirill Lavrov.

Awards and recognition 
The Vasilyev Brothers' State Prize of RSFSR was awarded to actor Lavrov for his performance in the leading role. The film also received several awards at various festivals in Europe and Soviet Union, including the Karlovy Vary International Film Festival Crystal Globe Award (1972).

Plot
Epic film in two episodes, based on a true story of creation and development of Soviet space and missile industry. Due to secrecy demand, all names were altered in the script, although most of the characters are easily recognizable. Sergei Korolev was prototype for the lead character Bashkirtsev, played by Kirill Lavrov.

Episode 1. He is obsessed with flying since his youth. Bashkirtsev's career takes shape after his meeting with visionary space scientist Konstantin Tsiolkovsky (played by Innokenti Smoktunovsky). Before World War II he develops the first rockets and builds a launch center in Central Russia. Then he makes the "Katyusha" weapon and takes it to the front-lines of World War II. In spite of his arrest and imprisonment, he continues working on rocket design. He is released from prison upon his request to fight in the front-lines against the Nazis.

Episode 2. After the end of World War II, Bashkirtsev makes a new rocket system, and works with nuclear scientist Igor Kurchatov on the nuclear missiles program. Then he makes a new rocket that launched "Sputnik" to orbit in 1957, from Baykonur Cosmodrome in Kazakhstan. His next achievement is the first man in space, Yuri Gagarin, and other human space missions. By the mid 1960s Bashkirtsev makes developments for the flight to the Moon. However, Bashkirtsev's uncompromising character causes him many problems with Soviet politicians, in additions to other pressures in his life, and he dies from a heart attack. His mission is carried on by his colleagues and apprentices.

Main cast
Kirill Lavrov as Andrei Bashkirtsev (character based on Sergei Korolev)
Ada Rogovtseva as Natalia Bashkirtseva
Igor Gorbachev as Ognev
Andrei Popov as Gromov
Igor Vladimirov as General Anatoly Golovin, Chairman of the State Commission
Innokenti Smoktunovsky as Konstantin Tsiolkovsky
Petr Shelokhonov as Mikhail Karelin
Svetlana Korkoshko as Zoya Konstantinova
Vsevolod Safonov as Leonid Sretensky
Zinovi Gerdt as Arthur Matveevich Kartashov, lecturer
Yevgeny Matveyev as   factory director
Vera Kuznetsova as Bashkirtsev's  mother  
Andro Kobaladze as Josef Stalin
 Yuri Leonidov as major general Morozov
Ivan Ryzhov as Alekseich
Valentina Khmara as Korolev's secretary
Vadim Spiridonov as Ivan Flyorov
Nikolai Barmin as aviation general
Galiks Kolchitsky as Igor Kurchatov
Boris Belyakov as constructor
Georgi Kulikov as Sharov
Georgi Shevtsov as assembly member
Yevgeny Steblov as Innokenti Bashkirtsev
 Anatoly Chelombitko as Yuri Gagarin

Admissions and DVD sales
 1972 theatrical admissions : 27,600,000 (Soviet Union) 
 1972 theatrical admissions in Europe : unknown
 1991 — 2011 video and DVD sales in Russia and Europe : over 10 million copies

Production

 Mosfilm studio was the main production company. Additional production assistance was provided by the Red Army and Gagarin Space Center in Moscow, by Baykonur Cosmodrome in Kazakhstan, and by OKB 1 and OKB 3 missile industries in central Russia and in Ukraine.
 All actors and crew had to pass background checks to get clearance for filming at Cosmodrome Baykonur and Gagarin Space Center in 1970 and 1971.
 Footages of Baykonur Kosmodrome in Kazakhstan and of the Soviet Space Center in Moscow are adding authenticity to the film, but most of the footages had not been released to the public. The original director's cut had 5500 meters of film length, but then it was shown to Brezhnev and Politbureau and was censored before the public release in 1972; the film was reduced to 4553m and ran 166 minutes. Currently available copies run only 158 minutes.

Comments
 
Epic film about the Soviet space program. Loosely based on bio of the top-secret Russian rocket designer Sergei Korolev (b. 1906 - d. 1966). Film was released 6 years after Korolev's death, still the Soviet censorship covered his real name. Other characters are also based on real people, but their names were top secret in the Soviet Union. Today astronautics.com gives some real names as well as the accurate list of actors in the original cast from the German opening night booklet. Soviet censorship ordered several scenes to be deleted, so many characters were altered and reduced, which caused changes in film's opening and closing credits.
The film was originally planned for release on April 12, 1971, the 10th anniversary of Gagarin's flight, but the film was banned by censorship. It was cut and shortened several times until it was seen by the Defence Minister Ustinov and Brezhnev, which led to further censorship of several scenes related to rocket science and politics. What's left of the film today is a patchwork of scenes of rocket launches, technical discussions mixed with politics, and a fictitious love story. Also fictitious are scenes showing Soviet political leaders and the Red Army Commanders in their nervous discussions about arms race and technology, showing the paranoia of the Cold War.
Censorship and political influences are evident in the film, in some parts the editing is abrupt and hectic, because the banned footages of film were cut out and destroyed, so it affected characters development and caused incongruent cuts. Soviet political censorship dominated over the filmmakers. Filming locations were top secret in the Soviet Union, such as the Baykonur Cosmodrome in Kazakhstan and the Gagarin Space Center near Moscow. Military censorship watched the secret equipment and rocket science machinery that were not allowed to be seen, so several scenes with good acting were cut out and destroyed. The total length of destroyed footages was about 1200–1500 meters of film, so the film was reduced by more than one hour.
Cinematographers expressed their regrets that several beautiful scenes on location at Baykonur Cosmodrome were deleted and destroyed by the Soviet censorship, so the original director's cut was losing scene after scene until it was cleared in a much shorter version for public release in April 1972. The original 1971 version of the film ran almost four hours, but it was reduced down to two and a half hours, before international release. The actors and filmmakers were still happy, that after two years of work, the film was allowed for release, albeit in a shorter version.
The film shows pride in such events as the launch of "Sputnik" in 1957, and the flight of Gagarin, the first man in space, in 1961. But in 1969, four American astronauts walked on the Moon, and two more landed there in February 1971, leaving Russia behind in the space race. Then the Soviet leadership released this film. The space race and the arms race are shown here from the Soviet side. Political figures of Stalin and the nuclear scientist Kurchatov are portrayed with careful exaggeration. Other historic figures, like Tsiolkovsky and Gagarin fit well, albeit the fictitious parallel story of the main character's wife has no chemistry. Cinematography with two cameras is impressive, and music score by Andrei Petrov is memorable.
The State Prize of Russia was awarded to actor Lavrov for his performance in the leading role. The film also received several awards at various festivals in Europe and Russia, including the Karlovy Vary International Film Festival Award (1972).

References

External links

 Taming of the fire
 
 
 Actors starring in the film Taming of the Fire : 

1972 films
Mosfilm films
1970s Russian-language films
1970s biographical drama films
Soviet biographical drama films
Russian biographical drama films
Films set in the 1930s
Films set in the 1940s
Films set in the 1950s
Films set in the 1960s
Crystal Globe winners
Films about space programs
Films scored by Andrey Petrov
Cultural depictions of Yuri Gagarin
1972 drama films